Sollstedt is a municipality in the district of Nordhausen, in Thuringia, Germany. On 1 January 2009, it incorporated the former municipality Rehungen.

References

Nordhausen (district)